Lawrence Steinman is an immunologist and neurologist professor of pediatrics at Stanford University. 

Since 2015, he has been a member of the National Academy of Sciences.

References

American immunologists
American pediatricians
Stanford University staff

Living people
Year of birth missing (living people)

Place of birth missing (living people)
Date of birth missing (living people)